Torrey Peters (born July 1981) is an American author. Her debut novel, Detransition, Baby, has received mainstream and critical success. The novel was nominated for the 2021 Women’s Prize for Fiction.

Early life and education 
Peters was born in Evanston, Illinois. Her father was a professor and her mother was a lawyer.

She grew up in Chicago, later attending Hampshire College. She graduated from the University of Iowa with an MFA and from Dartmouth College with an MA in Comparative Literature.

Work 
Peters’s first two self-published novellas, The Masker and Infect Your Friends and Loved Ones, were published online in 2016 and reviewed by writer Harron Walker for them. The Masker is about a person contemplating transitioning from male to female. Set in a dystopian future where bioterrorism has destroyed the body's ability to produce sex hormones, Infect Your Friends and Loved Ones follows Patient Zero and her cat-and-mouse relationship with Lexi, a working-class, gun-obsessed trans girl. Glamour Boutique, Peters's third novella, explores a casual Craigslist encounter at a crossdressers’ boutique store. In 2021, it was announced that Infect Your Friends and Loved Ones and The Masker would be reissued by Random House in 2022 and would be published in a collection under the title Infect Your Friends and Loved Ones.

She has written reviews for a breadth of transgender and gender non-conforming authors, such as Janet Mock, Akwaeke Emezi, and Casey Plett, who have published books through Arsenal Pulp Press, Metonymy, and Topside Press.

Detransition, Baby 

Peters' debut novel, Detransition, Baby, published by Penguin Random House Profile Books in 2021, was met with critical success and praise for crafting an exploration of gender, parenthood, and love. The main characters are Reese, a trans woman working in PR and former partner of Amy; Amy, who detransitions and becomes Ames; and Katrina, a Chinese Jewish woman who is Ames' boss and pregnant with his child.

Detransition, Baby was nominated for the 2021 Women’s Prize for Fiction, making Peters the first openly trans woman nominated for the award. The longlisting of Peters was met with some controversy from those who did not consider her to be a woman. A letter argued that she is "male" and therefore should not be eligible for the prize. Its list of signatories included atheist writer Ophelia Benson and environmentalist Rebecca Lush, but as a rhetorical strategy the letter also included long-dead writers such as Emily Dickinson and Willa Cather. Authors including Melinda Salisbury, Joanne Harris, and Naoise Dolan—another nominee for the 2021 prize—condemned the letter and expressed their support for Peters. The organisers of the prize released a statement condemning the letter and defending the decision to nominate Peters' book.

Personal life
Peters came out as transgender at age 26. At 30, she began taking hormones to physically transition.

In 2009, Peters married Olive Minor. In 2010, the pair lived in Kampala, Uganda while Minor worked on an ethnography of Uganda's only lesbian bar. The strain of suppressing her gender amid Uganda's debate over the 2009 Anti-Homosexuality Bill caused Peters to leave Kampala while Minor completed her research. Peters and Minor divorced in 2015 but remain close friends.  Peters lives in New York with her wife, whom she married that month.

References 

Writers from Chicago
University of Iowa alumni
21st-century American writers
Dartmouth College alumni
Date of birth missing (living people)
Living people
Transgender women
LGBT people from Illinois
Hampshire College alumni
1981 births
American transgender writers